The Heat is the second album by rock artist Jesse Malin. It was released on June 29, 2004, on Artemis Records.

Track listing
"Mona Lisa"
"Swinging Man"
"Silver Manhattan"
"Arrested"
"Since You're In Love"
"Going Out West"
"Scars Of Love"
"New World Order"
"About You"
"Block Island"
"Basement Home"
"Hotel Columbia"
"Indian Summer"
"God's Lonely People"

References

Jesse Malin albums
2004 albums
Artemis Records albums